Seek My Face is a 2002 book by John Updike.

Synopsis
The novel follows the life of Hope Chafetz, an elderly artist who is being interviewed by a journalist. During the interview Hope discusses her many marriages, one of which is to a famous painter.

Reception
In a review for New York Times Michiko Kakutani criticized the book's characters, which she felt were unbelievable.

References 

Novels by John Updike
2003 American novels
Novels about artists